The term "woman" generally refers to an adult human female. However, the concept of what it means to be a woman is complex and multifaceted, and has been subject to much discussion and debate in fields such as gender studies, feminism, and sociology. 

However, in general, a woman can be defined as an adult human female who identifies as a female and is biologically capable of bearing offspring through reproductive organs such as the ovaries and uterus.

The World Health Organization (WHO) defines a woman as "an adult female person who has reached puberty, regardless of whether she has reached menopause or not" (WHO, n.d.). Women in Nigeria are a diverse group of individuals who have a wide range of experiences and backgrounds. They are mothers, daughters, sisters, wives, entrepreneurs, professionals, and activists. Women in Nigeria face numerous challenges, including gender inequality, poverty, and a lack of access to education and healthcare. Despite these challenges, Nigerian women are making strides in all areas of life and are becoming increasingly empowered to take control of their lives and their futures.
Nigeria's underdevelopment regarding the status of their women, due to a long history of colonial exploitation and oppression, has brought about a distortion of Nigeria's economic, educational, religious, cultural, social, ideological and social orientations. Nigeria has a long history of gender inequality and discrimination against women. Women in Nigeria face a number of challenges, including limited access to education, health care, and economic opportunities. Women are also disproportionately affected by poverty, violence, and other forms of discrimination. The Nigerian government has taken steps to address these issues, but progress has been slow. Women are still underrepresented in politics and decision-making roles, and they are often excluded from economic opportunities. Additionally, traditional gender roles and cultural norms continue to limit the potential of women in Nigeria. The social role of women in Nigeria varies according to religious, cultural and geographic factors. However, many Nigerian cultures see women solely as mothers, sisters, daughters and wives. For instance, women in Northern Nigeria are more likely to be secluded in the home than women in Southern Nigeria, who tend to participate more in public life. In Southern Nigeria, widows experience different ill-treatment from their in-laws, which include forcing them to drink the remnant water after bathing the dead husband, sleeping on bare floor, wearing black gown, and denying them inheritance from the wealth of their deceased husband. Modern challenges for the women of Nigeria include child marriage, female genital mutilation, rape, and domestic violence. Gender inequality in Nigeria is an ongoing issue, with the state ranking 168th out of 191 countries in the Gender Inequality Index.

Social issues

Child marriage 

Child marriage is a marriage or union between two people in which one or both parties are under the age of 18. It is a violation of human rights and is considered a form of child abuse. Child marriage is most common in developing countries, where poverty and cultural norms are major contributing factors.

Child marriage is quite common in Nigeria, with about 43% of girls getting married before the age of 18 years, and 17% before they turn 15. The prevalence, however, varies greatly by region. Nigeria's total fertility rate is 5.07 children/woman. Nigeria's high fertility rate is associated with socio-economic problems and under-development.

Domestic violence 
Domestic violence is a pattern of behavior in which one person in an intimate relationship or marriage uses physical violence, coercion, threats, intimidation, isolation, stalking, emotional abuse, sexual abuse, or economic deprivation to control and/or harm the other person. Domestic violence can occur between current or former intimate partners, family members, or roommates.

Prostitution and causes

Causes 

 Abject poverty
 Poverty is a major cause of prostitution in Nigeria. Women such as widows, divorcees, single mothers and orphans who are not gainfully employed may go into prostitution as a means of livelihood for themselves and their children.
 Poverty is one of the most common causes of prostitution. People who are living in poverty may turn to prostitution as a way to make money to support themselves and their families.
 Influence of Rich Nigerian Men
 The story of illicit trade in prostitution cannot be complete without the mention of affluent Nigerian men that patronize the prostitutes, thereby encouraging them and making the illicit trade flourish in the country. “To support this claim, whenever our senior government officials and other business moguls come to big towns on “official business, they usually have time to relax' with young girls brought to them by pimps and the likes. At the end of the romp, they settle them with hefty sums of money they have equally embezzled in their various offices."
 Bad Government and Poor Economy
 The army that was trained to protect lives and property found themselves in political offices, inherited a very robust economy but because of greed and ineptitude, they turned the nation's economy into something of a dud, Consequently, forcing woman into prostitution in order to survive the harsh economic situation the country is in. Added to the above, governments ineptitude towards educational matters, as it concerns scholarships, educational awards for poor students is another major cause forcing indigent students or other ladies in prostitution in Nigeria.
 Globalization 
 Globalization also enables more rapid movement of people across national and international boundaries, thereby encouraging sex tourism and trafficking for prostitution, particularly among teenagers of between 13 and 17 years of age.
Lack of Education and Employment Opportunities                                                                                                              1.People who lack education and employment opportunities may turn to prostitution as a way to make money.
 Gender Inequality: Gender inequality can lead to women feeling that they have no other choice but to turn to prostitution in order to make money. 
 Sexual Abuse: People who have been sexually abused may turn to prostitution as a way to cope with the trauma they have experienced. 
 Drug Addiction: Drug addiction can lead people to turn to prostitution as a way to support their habit.
 Religious Institutions
 These social institutions have failed in their role at discouraging the mad rush into illicit trade of prostitution. Parents and guardians were always eager to send their children to such religious schools, knowing the kind of impact it will have on the life of the growing child. Unfortunately, the reverse is the case today. The religious institutions are after fundraising for one thing or the other and glorifying highest donors, leaving morality and character molding to whoever cares to do that.

Girl child labour

Polygamy 

12 out of the 36 Nigerian states recognize polygamous marriages as being equivalent to monogamous marriages. All twelve states are governed by Islamic Sharia Law. The States, which are all northern, include the states of Bauchi, Borno, Gombe, Jigawa, Kaduna, Kano, Katsina, Kebbi, Niger, Sokoto, Yobe, and Zamfara which allows for a man to take more than one wife.

Elsewhere, both Christians and traditionalists in polygamous unions are recognized by customary law. These unions are contingent upon the absence of prior civil marriage, as bigamy technically applies, but even when present, men are seldom ever prosecuted for bigamy in Nigeria.

Polygamy is legal in Nigeria, and is practiced by many of the country's ethnic groups. It is estimated that about one-third of Nigerian marriages are polygamous. Polygamy is most common among the Hausa, Fulani, and Yoruba peoples. The practice is also found among the Igbo, Kanuri, and Tiv peoples. Polygamy is seen as a way to ensure that all children are provided for and that a family's lineage is preserved. It is also seen as a way to strengthen family ties and to provide economic security. In some cases, polygamy is seen as a way to ensure that a woman has a husband who can provide for her and her children. In Nigeria, polygamy is regulated by customary law. This means that each ethnic group has its own rules and regulations regarding the practice. Generally, a man must obtain permission from his first wife before taking another wife. He must also be able to provide for all of his wives and children financially.

Women's health 

Nigerian women and girls are disproportionately affected by Nigeria's ineffective healthcare system. One reason for this is the prevalence of patriarchal norms that give men jurisdiction over women's medical decisions. This is exacerbated by poverty, lack of education, and the resources required in order to visit medical facilities. The issue of transport is a serious one as it hinders women from accessing healthcare services. The Nigeria Demographic and Health Survey conducted in 2018 reveals that nearly 52% of Nigerian women experience at least one issue when trying seek healthcare services, with financial insecurity being the biggest hindrance.

Reproductive health 
Reproductive health is an important matter concerning the health of women in Nigeria. Nigerian laws only allow for abortions in cases where pregnancy poses a threat to the mother's life. Nonetheless, an estimated 1.8 to 2.7 million women terminate their pregnancies each year. This is because many women resort to receiving abortions in illegal and unsafe conditions which usually result in diseases and even death. Approximately 25% of the Nigerian women who terminate their pregnancies find themselves with severe health problems. Existing research further supposes that up to 6,000 Nigerian women die from induced abortions each year. Additionally, Nigeria has the highest rate of maternal mortality out of all African nations and the fourth highest globally, with 576 mothers dying per 100,000 births.

While customs and norms regarding women's health do vary when it comes to the northern and southern regions of Nigeria, one similarity that can be found is that girls and women are given less food relative to their male counterparts, they are expected to perform more labor domestically than their male counterparts, and their movement is more restricted than the boys and men in their household. Thus, the health problems that Nigerian women face, such as dealing with anemia, can be traced back to these norms that are prevalent throughout Nigeria.

As mentioned above, there are some variations when it comes to reproductive health and associated factors. One of those factors is marriage and pregnancy occurring at an early age for Nigerian women and this is more profound in the northern region of Nigeria, among Hausa communities. The North has a maternal mortality rate of 21 maternal deaths per 1000 pregnancies, which is higher in comparison to the country's overall maternal mortality rate. Girls in Hausa communities may get married at the age of 11 and begin to have children a few years later which results in them developing health problems. Research reveals that if these girls engaged in sexual intercourse and childbearing at a later stage of life, then the high rates of carcinoma of the cervix among found among Hausa women would be brought down dramatically. Moreover, there are instances in which these pregnant girls are not physically large enough to give birth vaginally and this leads to cases of obstructed labor, which can have detrimental effects for the mother and the child if surgery is not performed. In addition, there is a custom in this region where the women are secluded in their homes and the men are in charge of escorting them to places outside the home. This materializes in the form of men making medical decisions for their wives and women giving birth at home with the help of a traditional birth attendant. Furthermore, Hausa women are subject to local and state rules that require them to seek permission from their husbands or bring their husbands along with them when going to acquire contraception. This puts their reproductive rights in the hands of their husbands.

Female genital cutting (also known as female genital mutilation) in Nigeria accounts for a significant portion of female genital cutting/mutilation (FGM/C) cases, worldwide. The practice is considered harmful to girls and women and a violation of human rights. FGM causes infertility, maternal death, infections, and the loss of sexual pleasure. Gishiri cuts, hymenectomy, and female circumcision are all practiced in Nigeria. Nationally, 27% of Nigerian women between the ages of 15 and 49 were victims of FGM, as of 2012. In the last 30 years, prevalence of the practice has decreased by half in some parts of Nigeria. From 2012 to 2018 alone, there has been a 7% decrease in the proportion of women who experienced FGM. Although this is a practice prevalent throughout Nigeria, it is more concentrated in the South East and West of Nigeria and more prevalent in Yoruba communities.

Women and politics

Participation in politics

Pre-colonial era 
Prior to colonization, Nigerian women were quite involved in the political process. In the Bornu Empire, women took part in administering the state. Queen Bakwa Turuku founded the city of Zaria and her daughter built a defensive wall around the city in order to repel invasions. Ancient Yorubaland comprised eight high ranking chieftains who helped the ruler rule the kingdom.

The Igbo women of Nigeria were politically active in their communities during this period. One political system that was prevalent here was the dual-sex system. In this system, women's organizations and men's organizations acted side by side. Some examples of these women-led organizations were secret societies and courts for women. Authority was shared between the two genders as a way of promoting unity. A prominent position enjoyed by Igbo women under this system was that of the Omu, which translates to "mother of the society". Those that attained this position did so independently of their male relatives. The Omu made decisions that pertained to both men and women. She was in charge of overseeing and regulating the marketplace by settling market prices and disputes. The Omu was also the head of the council that was in charge of local trade. Both she and other women were obligated to attend assemblies to discuss important matters pertaining to the people. They had discretion in important matters, such as waging war.

Another political system that existed among the Igbo was the corporate political system, which was characterized by relationships and was male-dominated. Igbo women hold positions of power within this system because of their relationships to their male family members. Nonetheless, these women still held influential roles. For instance, the oldest daughter, known as the Isa Ada, was seen as the leader of women and the mother of the lineage. In some areas, she played a direct role in decision-making processes.

Other organizations also held influence within communities during this time. Some of these organizations were "society of daughters of the lineage", "association of lineage wives", and the "women's assembly". Their purpose was to police women and ensure they were in compliance with societal customs. Some of the responsibilities the society of daughters of the lineage had included were mediation and serving as the supreme court of appeal for all issues pertaining to women. On the other hand, the association of lineage wives acted as a lower court.

Decolonization 
Nigerian women were also politically active when it came to the decolonization of their homeland during the 1940s and 50s. Women's organizations were the channels through which women organized and mobilized against colonization. Some key organizations during this time period were the Nigerian Women's Union and the National Council of Women's Societies. There were also women's wings of parties created by women that allowed for their voices to be heard. This is also when Southern Nigerian women had acquired the right to vote. The Igbo women garnered support from women for the National Council of Nigeria and Citizens, which would rule Nigeria at independence.

Post-colonial Nigeria 
The role of women in Nigerian politics is shaped by the patriarchal nature of the society. This dense religious and tribal country provides the setting for the oppression Nigerian women face in politics and in everyday life. Furthermore, the militaristic tendencies of Nigerian society are reflected in the way women are treated by the justice system in terms of sexual violence, corruption, and false imprisonment. Nonetheless, women in Nigeria have been able to come together in feminist movements, such as the Women in Nigeria (organization) (WIN) founded in 1982, to combat male supremacy in Nigeria and shape feminism as a force for Nigerian women. Nigerian women did not gain their voting rights until relatively recently. The 1950s presented many debates regarding women's access to political responsibilities and their stance on voting rights in Nigeria. It was not until 1979 when all Nigerian women gained their voting rights. To this day, Nigerian women still rally and fight to further their political voice and representation.

In The World's Economic Forum's Global Gender Gap report for 2018, Nigeria was ranked 139th out of a total 149 countries, in terms of gender gap in 'political empowerment'. As of 2019, out of 193 countries globally, Nigeria is at the 181st position when it comes to women's descriptive representation in parliament. During 2015 Nigerian elections, Nigeria had 20 women out of 359 in its Lower House (5.6%) and 7 out of 109 in Upper House (6.4%). As of the most recent elections, 7.3% of the Nigerian Senate and 3.1% of the House of Representatives are women. There are no state governors that are women. There are no laws implemented to improve the gender gap. In 2014, the Women Advocates Research and Documentation Centre (WARDC) and the Nigerian Women Trust Fund (NWTF) outlined “Nigerian Women Charter of Demand” that demanded to have 35% of women incorporated in all sectors of government. The barriers to women participation in politics are election time violence, economic restrictions, and patriarchy according to the Head of the Gender Division for the Independent National Electoral Commission. In particular, female candidates often suffer from election violence, threats or hate speech. Political parties have excluded women, and do little to encourage the participation. During the 2018 primaries, there were incidents in which women were harassed and even made to give up their party ticket.

To help increase the number of women working in the government, The Nigerian Women's Trust Fund (NWTF) uses funding, networking opportunities, mentoring, training for leadership, and advocacy. It is supported by the Ministry of Women Affairs and Social Development (MWASD), UN Women.

As of 2006, Nigeria's National Gender Policy has called for the increase of women in government positions to 35%. However, these provisions have yet to materialize as the proportion of women in parliament is much less than that figure.

Challenges with tradition 
Women in Nigeria face many challenges when interacting with political life, one of them being societal tradition. Nigeria is dominated by Christianity and Islam which, despite neither directly supporting gender discrimination or marginalization, provide the societal framework by which many women are unable to access support due to social issues such as traditional beliefs, military dictatorship, tribal uprisings, and more. It is normal to find Nigerian women confined to the household, required to please their husbands because divorce is highly looked down upon in the Islamic tradition. A successful marriage, in most cases, means that a woman is to provide sex at her husband's demand. Nigerian women are traditionally expected to be nurturing mothers, daughters and sisters, societal roles that find themselves in the household caring for children, or performing minor tasks such as selling crafts. This stereotypical role is tied to the reason why many Nigerian men view women as inferior and do not support their participation in government.

A lot of these challenges stem from European colonization which imposed its own societal norms and customs upon Nigerians. Prior to colonization, Nigerian communities, such as the Igbo, saw women participating in politics. Colonization pushed these attitudes aside and sought to impose its own beliefs. Christian missionaries sought to replace Igbo religious and cultural practices which eventually hurt Nigerian women. The British did not give Igbo women any political legitimacy as they not only ignored the women, but they only ruled through and dealt with male authorities. In turn, this hindered the activity of female political bodies. The Native Ordinances Act of 1901 deemed only the Native Courts, which were established by the British, to be legitimate courts. The political system that had existed prior to the arrival of the British was being diminished. Furthermore, under this British administration, Nigerian boys were taught skills that would allow them to manage industries and work in the courts. They were also given access to Western education whereas the girls were confined to areas of study that the British thought were suited for women. However, Nigerian women were still politically active during this period. They rose against the British. Some key occurrences are the Women's War of 1929, the 1929 Water Rate Demonstrations, and the Nwaobiala Movement in 1925. Despite this frustration, women still participated in this new political process even though the opportunities were very limited due to the beliefs of the British. Madam Okwei was the first Igbo women that participated in the new political system as she held a position within a Native Court.

Family rights and inheritance 
A woman has few rights within her home and family, even though it may be her sole world and environment. All over the country a woman is considered to have no legal right to her own children, all property of the house is considered to belong to the man, even if it is paid for by the woman. In Islam woman can only inherit half of what men can inherit and in many areas of the country women are not allowed to inherit land or property, a cycle of constant dependency for a man. Many women have no control over the income produced by their labor. For example, women peasants who work hard in the fields alongside men have no say in how the produce or money is utilized.

Initial roles in government 
Women were elected as "special members" of the Nigerian Western assembly during the country's early years of pushing towards a federal system. The electoral system was made up of three colleges, the first being Villages, second the Intermediary Electoral College of Districts, and finally the College of the Divisions. Deputies were elected at the first two levels by taxpaying male and female voters. The highest electoral college was elected through a secret ballot. The voting system of elections provided a prime opportunity for clientelism to come into play. Women could not rise higher than the first electoral college because they did not have support from traditionally minded men and not all voting women had the means to support them through the taxpaying suffrage system thus the whole system privileged men aiming higher. Because of the near impossibility of women gaining representation in government, the men of the 1950s requested for women to have one of the three seats reserved for special members (being underrepresented communities). Elizabeth Adekogbe, a Nigerian women's rights leader born in 1919, argued that this seat was not so much of a step forward as it appeared to be. Rather than giving women a real voice in government it gave men the opportunity to choose a woman who aligned with their beliefs and use her as a guise for reform. She critiqued the fact that women would be viewed as a separate minority group rather than full members of society. In 1953, this position was filled by Mrs Remilekun Iseoluwa Aiyedun, a member of the Protestant church who in-fact criticized this appointment claiming that a women's responsibility remained in the household rather than in political activity.

Timeline of significant events

Women's advocacy 
A national feminist movement was inaugurated in 1982, and a national conference held at Ahmadu Bello University. The papers presented there indicated a growing awareness by Nigeria's university-educated women that the place of women in society required a concerted effort and a place on the national agenda; the public perception, however, remained far behind.

As an example, a feminist meeting in Ibadan came out against polygamy and was then soundly criticized by market women, who said they supported the practice because it allowed them to pursue their trading activities and have the household looked after at the same time. Research in the north has indicated that many women opposed the practice, and tried to keep bearing children to stave off a second wife's entry into the household. Although women's status would undoubtedly rise, for the foreseeable future Nigerian women lacked the opportunities of men.

Yinka Jegede-Ekpe, a Nigerian HIV/AIDS activist and HIV-positive individual, established the Nigerian Community of Women Living With HIV/AIDS in 2001. The group intended to inform women about the risks of HIV/AIDS and to empower them to speak out.

Women's organizations

Women in Nigeria organization 
Women in Nigeria evolved out of a study group of university sociology and political science lecturers at ABU and claims to be a group aiming for organization, consistency, and clear objectives. They employed the highly logical strategy of collecting data of the condition of Nigerian women through research and analysis so that women could advocate for their rights backed by real information. The group spent time researching for publications that once published became invaluable for understanding gender issues in Nigeria. WIN also assembles a forum titled the Nigerian Feminist Forum (NFF) launched in 2008. NFF and WIN have had success in blocking the passing of laws prohibiting condoms, institutionalizing dress codes, and even a private university's request for girls to prove their virginity prior to study through press conferences and the weight of mobilization of Nigerian women rallying against the passing of these proposed bills. Another recently formed group of this kind is the Feminist Coalition, established in July 2020. Yet another group, The ElectHer organization, was established to address the under representation of women in elections across Africa. Their goal is to achieve 50% representation in government by women across Africa by 2050.

Nigerian women in contemporary politics

Nigerian women rally against rejection of pro-equality bills 
The Nigerian parliament denied the passing of several gender bills in 2022 resulting in a protest of many Nigerian women at the countries capital. Nigerian legislature voted to amend the controversial 199 constitution which surfaced during the transition to democracy that same year. This would help serve to correct historical imbalances of women in electoral politics. If passed, these bills would have allowed foreign born husbands of Nigerian women to gain citizenship, and given women the right to become indigenes of their husband's state after five years of marriage. An interesting parallel to the fact that wives of Nigerian men are granted citizenship upon marriage. There was also discussion of allotting 35% of the legislative seats to women, and reserving 35% of political party leadership, for women. None of these bills were passed which shows the deep rooted conservative tradition of the Nigerian government. This was a major step backwards for female Nigerian lawmakers, activists, and citizens alike.

Nigerian gender gills 
This year the Nigerian legislature was seeking to change the country's constitution in the hopes of adding an amendment. Many organizations were pressurizing the government to implement women's rights through this amendment. The organizations wanted the government to codify electoral quotas that would reserve 35% of seats for women in both houses of the legislature, affirmative action policy that would guarantee that women make up at least 35% of their party, and the guarantee that 35% of political appointments would be reserved for women among other priorities. The government rejected these demands which led to these organizations protesting throughout the country. In turn, the lower house of the legislature has promised to reconsider some of these demands.

Women in the informal economy 
Agriculture plays a major role in Nigeria's economy contributing a quarter of the gross domestic product. The Nigerian government has promised to allocate 10% of the annual budget to agriculture but have not followed through. Women smallholder farmers are especially overlooked though they make up 70% of the work force and produce 60% of the food Nigerians depend on. These women play important roles in averting major threats such as resource conservation, food scarcity, while maintaining a healthy and functional ecosystem. They suffer from poor living conditions and have little say in development initiatives. Many times women like this have to rely on men to advance their social status when they are in fact the ones contributing to Nigeria's economy. One modern example of success, however, can be found in the Smallholder Women Farmers Organization in Nigeria. With the help of the International Budget Partnership, an organization working to promote inclusive sustainable development that promotes equity and justice, and data driven advocacy, these women succeed securing an 18.5% increase to the national government's spending on agriculture. As a result, 111,000 smallholder women farmers were given new or improved seeds and fertilizer to grow crops, more modern equipment to increase production.

Challenges of women in administrative positions 

 Political Inequality - Political inequality is still obscure in Nigeria. As men have control over assets and have relatively better education in many parts of the country, they have a dominant position in terms of political power. Traditionally, politics in Nigeria is seen as a male domain. Since all financial, economic, commercial, and political negotiations conducted outside the homes are by males, Nigerian women therefore, have very limited access to decision-making process and also have a severe lack of access to and control over financial resources.
 Gender Discrimination - The exclusions and deprivations faced by women in cultural and traditional settings often deprive them access to information, education, and wealth creating assets, such as land, capital, labour and entrepreneurial skills. These restrictions created by socio-cultural practices can be blamed for the poor participation of women in administrative positions in Nigeria. 
 Women as compromisers - Women tend to believe that holding political offices is the exclusive rights of the male folk. They look down on themselves and do not believe they have the potential for leadership.
 Rivalry among women - Nigerian society seems to encourage women to compete with one another in a subtle way. Unhealthy rivalry among women usually leads to “pull -her -down” syndrome associated with envy and jealousy, thus preventing the spirit of team play and support for one another in periods of need. 
 Religious beliefs - Different religions in Nigeria have different views as regards the position of women in worldly affairs. Many religious leaders still believe that women should only be seen and not heard, more particularly in the Northern part of Nigeria. The difference in beliefs adversely affect the way women are treated and the opportunity given to them.

Education

Women's education

Factors promoting gender inequality in the educational system 
Despite the relevance of equal educational opportunity in a developing country in Nigeria, Tahir (1991) maintained that: although women constitute about 55% of the Nigerian population, their level of participation in educational programmes of the nation is not proportionate to  their number.” Female literacy as well should be made to increase from the stagnant 52% to 80% in the rise of the technological age.

 Early Marriage - Median Age of marriage is 18 while men is 27, so when girls are married at the ages of 10–14 years, their educational careers are disrupted, especially if there is no provision for a second chance of a learning opportunity.
 Girls Hawking Practices - A common practice in Northern Nigeria and indeed in all traditional and urban settlements, to find girl-child hawking wares throughout the day. It is an economic practice carried out mainly at the instance of parents and guardians. The reason for this is to generate additional income for families. While this goes one, and when it is mainly restricted to the girl-child, a situation is created in which such girls miss the opportunity of a formal education, since education like economic activities is time specific. It is for this reason that this practice is considered to be discriminatory against girl children.
 Poor Parental Support for Women - This has to do with when parents are faced with the choice of sending a girl or boy to school. Most cases, boys will be preferred to girls. Apart from this, some parents are always apprehensive towards formal education for their girl. To such parents, formal education is capable of instilling strange attitudes, values, norms, and beliefs that could make the girl non-compliant in their characteristic disposition in society.
 Poverty- Inability to pay their school fees, buy uniforms, textbooks, and notebooks which are all extremely financially demanding and another salient factor preventing parents from sending their girls to school.

Probable remedies for gender inequality in the educational system 

 Establishment of girl schools- governments, especially in Northern Nigeria, should establish more primary and secondary schools that are meant for the education of girls alone. The current step by the Jorno, Jigawa, and Sokoto State governments in an effort to educate the almajiris is a step in the right direction which if extended to the education of women by other northern states governors will algo along way in maximizing the rate of inequality experienced by girl-child education.
 Intervention of Religious Institutions - Religious organizations should also establish both primary and secondary schools where girls should be given functional education. The efforts of Jama-atul Nasril Islam, Ansarudeen Society of Nigeria, Ahmadiya Muslim Movement, and NASFAT are commendable and complimentary of earlier efforts of the Christian Missions such as the Roman Catholic, Anglican, Baptist, and recent the Pentecostal Churches.
 Equal Opportunity - Young women should be encouraged through job creation efforts by the government and other corporate organizations, so that after schooling they will be gainfully employed. All constitutional constraints to women's development should be removed. This calls for a review of the present 1999 constitution, which does not meet all the needs and aspirations of the womenfolk. In reviewing the constitution, the political, economic, and socio-cultural freedom of all citizens should be entrenched.
 Enforcement of Law - The Federal Government should enact and enforce a law that girls should receive at least secondary education or its equivalent and that no girl should be married before the age of 18 years. Though the Universal Basic Education Act has taken cognizance of this but its implementation is ineffective.
 Diversification of the Curriculum - The present school must be diversified to meet the needs of all, in particular the interest and aspirations of women educationally. This is because some programmes have been stereotyped to be for females while others are for males. For example, Home Economics, Secretarial Studies, Nursing and Teaching at the elementary level are regarded as professions for women and any man found in those professions are looked down upon. Courses such as Engineering, Architecture, and Building are regarded as no-go areas for women. For this reason, the curriculum should be gender friendly for both sexes.

Regional differences

Northern Nigeria 

Northern women in Nigeria face a variety of challenges, including limited access to education, health care, and economic opportunities. They are also subject to gender-based violence, including early and forced marriage, female genital mutilation, and honor killings. In addition, they are often excluded from decision-making processes and lack representation in government. Despite these challenges, northern women are increasingly advocating for their rights and working to improve their lives and the lives of their communities. They are engaging in grassroots activism, forming networks and organizations to support each other, and advocating for policy change.

In the north, practices that were introduced in terms of women's position in society have been mainly as a result of colonialism and the introduction of salafism and wahhabism thought into the traditionally sufist region. This process has yielded, generally, less formal education; early teenage marriages, especially in rural areas; and confinement to the household, which was often polygamous, except for visits to family, ceremonies, and the workplace, if employment were available and permitted by a girl's family or husband. For the most part, Hausa women did not work in the fields, whereas Kanuri women did; both helped with harvesting and were responsible for all household food processing.

Urban women sold cooked foods, usually by sending young girls out onto the streets or operating small stands. Research indicated that this practice was one of the main reasons city women gave for opposing schooling for their daughters. Even in elite houses with educated wives, women's presence at social gatherings was either nonexistent or very restricted. In the modern sector, a few women were appearing at all levels in offices, banks, social services, nursing, radio, television, and the professions (teaching, engineering, environmental design, law, pharmacy, medicine, and even agriculture and veterinary medicine).

This trend resulted from women's secondary schools, teachers' colleges, and in the 1980s women holding approximately one-fifth of university places—double the proportion of the 1970s. Research in the 1980s indicated that, for the Muslim north, education beyond primary school was restricted to the daughters of the business and professional elites, and in almost all cases, courses and professions were chosen by the family, not the woman themselves.

However, in the last few years, the rate of women's employment has apparently increased as more women have been employed in the modern sector. You find them as cashiers in the banks, teachers in public and private primary and secondary schools, nurses at hospitals as well as television hosts of different TV programs. Although, the issue of women not occupying top positions still remains a huge challenge all over the country and across all sectors as most of these positions are occupied by men with little opportunities for equally qualified women. In addition, young ladies deciding on courses and professions to choose from now have the full autonomy to do that in some households especially in the southern part of the country. However, the north still lags behind in these apparent changes due to cultural laws.

Southern Nigeria 

In the south, women traditionally had economically important positions in interregional trade and the markets, worked on farms as major labour sources, and had influential positions in traditional systems of local organization. The south, like the north, had been polygynous; in 1990 it still was for many households, including those professing Christianity.

Women in the south, had received Western-style education since the nineteenth century, so they occupied positions in the professions and to some extent in politics. In addition, women headed households, something not seriously considered in Nigeria's development plans. Such households were more numerous in the south, but they were on the rise everywhere.

Recognition by authorities 
Generally, in Nigeria, development planning refers to "adult males," "households," or "families". Women were included in such units but not as a separate category. Up until the 1980s, the term "farmer" was assumed to be exclusively male, even though in some areas of the nation women did most of the farm work. In Nigerian terms, a woman was almost always defined as someone's daughter, wife, mother, or widow.

Single women were suspect, although they constituted a large category, especially in the cities, because of the high divorce rate. Traditionally, and to some extent this remained true in popular culture, single adult women were seen as available sexual partners should they try for some independence and as easy victims for economic exploitation. In Kaduna State, for example, investigations into illegal land expropriations noted that women's farms were confiscated almost unthinkingly by local chiefs wishing to sell to urban-based speculators and would-be commercial farmers.

Notable figures

Politics 
 Amina J. Mohammed — Deputy Secretary-General of the U.N.
 Gbemisola Ruqayyah Saraki — Politician and philanthropist.
 Florence Ita Giwa  — Politician.
 Ngozi Okonjo-Iweala — Economist, First Female Minister of Finance, Director-General of the World Trade Organization
 Funmilayo Ransome-Kuti, activist
Dora Akunyili — Former Minister of Information and Communication, Former Director General, National Agency for Food and Drug Administration and Control (NAFDAC) of Nigeria.
Kemi Adeosun — Minister of Finance (November 2015 – 2018)
Beni Lar, Member of Nigeria's House of Representatives and women's advocate

Business 

 Bilikiss Adebiyi Abiola  — Wecyclers CEO
 Folorunsho Alakija, Businesswoman
Hajia Bola Shagaya - Businesswoman and Fashion Enthusiast
Sola David-Borha, Chief Executive (Africa Region) of Standard Bank

Entertainment 

Agbani Darego — Model and Beauty Queen
Chimamanda Ngozi Adichie — Writer
Chioma Akpotha — Actress & Film Maker
Monalisa Chinda - Actress, film producer and TV personality
Folake Coker — Fashion Designer, Creative Director of Tiffany Amber
Funke Akindele — Actress
Genevieve Nnaji — Actress
Helen Paul — Comedian
Ireti Doyle — Actress
Kiki Mordi – Media personality and journalist
Aisha Salaudeen — Multimedia journalist
Krystal Okeke – Ms. Illinois USA Universal 2016 and founder of America Multicultural Kids Fashion Show and Miss America Nation beauty pageant
Mercy Chinwo - Singer, Songwriter & Actress
Onyinye Ough, author and activist
Osonye Tess Onwueme — Playwright
Mo Abudu, media personality
Tiwa Savage - Entertainer
Ufuoma McDermott — Actress & Film Maker
Yemi Alade - Entertainer

Authors and writers 
Catherine Obianuju Acholonu
Chimamanda Ngozi Adichie
Onyinye Ough, author and activist

Science 
Notable scientists include:

 Ameyo Adadevoh - Nigerian physician
 Professor Grace Alele-Williams - Mathematician
Francisca Nneka Okeke - Physicist
Deborah Ajakaiye - Geophysicists
Olabisi Ugbebor - Mathematician
Adenike Osofisan - Computer Scientist
Folasade Ogunsola - Medical Scientist
Chinedum Peace Babalola - Pharmacist
Lucy Jumeyi Ogbadu - Microbiologist
Eucharia Oluchi Nwaichi, Ph.D. - Environmental Biochemist
Stella Ifeanyi Smith, Ph.D. - Microbiologist

References
 (Data as of 1991.)

Further reading

Violence against women 

 Factors associated with attitudes towards intimate partner violence against women: a comparative analysis of 17 sub-Saharan countries
 Intimate partner violence and reproductive health of women
 Intimate Partner Abuse: Wife Beating among Civil Servants in Ibadan, Nigeria
 Intimate Partner Violence among Women in a Migrant Community in Southwest Nigeria
 Intimate Partner Violence: Prevalence and Perceptions of Married Men in Ibadan, Nigeria
 Influence of Community Social Norms on Spousal Violence: A Population-Based Multilevel Study of Nigerian Women

 
Nigeria